Daniel Alexandre Loureiro Silva Freitas (born 10 May 1991) is a Portuguese cyclist, who currently rides for UCI Continental team .

Major results

2009
 2nd Time trial, National Junior Road Championships
 5th Road race, UCI Junior Road World Championships
 5th Overall GP Général Patton
2015
 9th Overall Troféu Alpendre Internacional do Guadiana
2016
 4th Vuelta a La Rioja
2017
 10th Vuelta a La Rioja
2021
 3rd Overall 
 9th Overall Volta ao Alentejo
2022
 1st Stage 2 Troféu Joaquim Agostinho
 4th Overall Volta ao Alentejo
 7th Clássica da Arrábida

References

External links
 

1991 births
Living people
Portuguese male cyclists
Sportspeople from Vila Nova de Gaia